Catch That Kid is a 2004 family action comedy film directed by Bart Freundlich, written by Michael Brandt and Derek Haas, and starring Kristen Stewart, Corbin Bleu, Max Thieriot, Jennifer Beals, Sam Robards, John Carroll Lynch, and James Le Gros. It is a remake of the Danish film Klatretøsen (2002) and tells the story of three kids who rob a bank to obtain the money to pay for the expensive and experimental surgery needed for the father of one of them when the insurance company and the bank president won't help his wife.

The film's working titles were Mission Without Permission (also the film's UK title as well as part of one of the taglines), Catch That Girl, and Catch That Kid!

The film was met with negative reviews.

Plot
Madeline Rose "Maddy" Phillips (Kristen Stewart) is a 12-year-old girl who loves to climb, often ascending the nearby water tower. Her father Tom shares her passion, but fell more than 100 feet during a climb years earlier. Tom and his wife Molly (Jennifer Beals) are afraid Maddy may suffer a similar accident and have forbidden her from climbing. Latent injuries from Tom's fall have recently paralyzed him from the neck down.

The family hears of an experimental operation which can save him, but insurance will not pay for the operation and the family does not have $250,000 for the treatment. Harderbach Financial's president Donald Brisbane (Michael Des Barres) refuses to loan the amount, despite Molly being employed by the bank to design a security system. Maddy comes up with a plan to rob the bank for the money with her knowledge of her mother's system.

Maddy steals three go-carts from her father's race course and recruits her two friends Gus (Max Thieriot) a young mechanic, and Austin (Corbin Bleu) a computer geek and aspiring filmmaker, to help her. To convince them, she separately tells each one she loves him and gives him one half of her friendship necklace.

They break into Harderbach Financial on the night of a party Brisbane is throwing, bringing along Max, Maddy's infant brother, who she is supposed to be babysitting. Maddy distracts the security guards Ferrell (James Le Gross) and Gus' older brother Chad (Stark Sands). Maddy and Gus progress to a room with thousands of security deposit boxes while Austin watches Max and manipulates the cameras and alarms to keep the guards away from them. After a sudden equipment failure with her climbing gear, Maddy is forced to free climb the rest of the way up to the main vault containing hundreds of thousands of dollars. Upon reaching the vault door, she accidentally triggers a timer, then with seconds left, cracks the code ("Madeline"), grabs $250,000 from the vault and they flee the room, unintentionally setting off the alarm after forgetting to type the exit code. The trio manages to escape the bank's Rottweilers and re-escapes Chad who tasers Ferrell, but then lets them go before accidentally tasering himself.

Molly arrives at the bank and Brisbane accuses her system of being useless and fires a Phillips family friend and bank employee Hartmann (John Carroll Lynch). Brisbane's guest Francois Nuffaut (Françios Giroday) apologizes to Molly and redirects the blame onto Brisbane for throwing a party at the bank before the security system was operable.

Gus and Austin find out that Maddy played them after seeing each other's necklaces and leave her, but the trio reunites during a police chase and evades them successfully.

Maddy and her friends go to the hospital with the money to pay for the surgery, but Molly realizes who the thieves are (through the amount they stole being equal to that of surgery costs and the climbing gear Maddy left in the vault) and intercepts them. Molly realizes her daughter was only doing what she thought was right for her father and does a cover-up by telling the bank executives that the robbery was an unplanned test she performed as chief of security. As they leave, reporters outside the hospital give the public the full story.

Molly forgives Maddy for her actions, the public and the news studio sympathizes with the Phillips family and donates money for Tom's surgery, Brisbane is fired, and Hartmann is promoted to bank president and gives them the loan.

Three months later, Tom has recovered from the surgery. Maddy, Gus, and Austin continue to argue about who will be a better boyfriend for Maddy.

Cast

Production
Mara Wilson revealed she auditioned for the role of Maddy Phillips, despite knowing she was too old for the role, in an 2016 article written by the actress for The Guardian.

Reception

Box office
Catch That Kid opened at #6 in the weekend of February 6, 2004 raking in $5.8 million in its first opening weekend. The film spent two weeks at the U.S. box office top ten. The film made $16.7 million in the United States and $226,963 in other countries for a worldwide total of $16.9 million, against a budget of $12 million.

Critical response
On Rotten Tomatoes, the film received an approval rating of 13% based on 86 reviews and an average score of 3.82/10. The site's critical consensus reads: "An unimaginative heist movie aimed strictly at the preteen set." On Metacritic, the film holds a score of 33 out of 100, based on 27 critics, indicating "generally unfavorable reviews".<ref>{{cite web |url=https://www.metacritic.com/movie/transformers-age-of-extinction |title=Catch That Kid |publisher=Metacritic/CBS Interactive |accessdate=2014-08-29}}</ref>

Critics overall expressed dislike towards the film's questionable morals and lack of originality, comparing it unfavorably to the Spy Kids trilogy. Despite these negative reviews, Roger Ebert of Ebert & Roeper and the Chicago Sun Times gave Catch That Kid "thumbs up", stating that it is as much fun as Spy Kids, Kim Possible and more fun than Agent Cody Banks''.

Novelization
A novelization of the story was released in conjunction with the film. The novel was written by Suzanne Weyn, Michael Brandt, and Derek Haas.

See also
 List of American films of 2004

References

External links
 
 
 
 

2004 films
2000s adventure comedy films
2000s crime comedy films
2000s heist films
2000s teen comedy films
American adventure comedy films
American children's comedy films
American teen comedy films
American crime comedy films
American heist films
American spy films
American remakes of Danish films
English-language German films
German spy films
German adventure comedy films
English-language Danish films
Danish comedy films
20th Century Fox films
Films directed by Bart Freundlich
Films scored by George S. Clinton
Films shot in Los Angeles
Films set in Los Angeles
2004 comedy films
2000s English-language films
2000s American films
2000s German films